PLD may refer to:

Political parties
 Partido de la Liberación Dominicana (Dominican Liberation Party)
 Party for Liberties and Development  (Parti pour les Libertés et le Développement), Chad
 Liberal Democratic Party (Angola)
 Liberal Democratic Party (Italy)
 Liberal Democratic Party (Romania)
 Liberal Democratic Pole

Science and technology
 Pegylated Liposomal Doxorubicin, a pegylated liposomal form of the anticancer medication doxorubicin
 Phospholipase D, an enzyme which cleaves phosphatidylcholine to produce phosphatidic acid and choline
 PLD Space, a European space company focused on developing low cost launch vehicles
 Polycystic liver disease, multiple cysts scattered throughout the normal liver tissue
 Programmable logic device, a type of integrated circuit semiconductor
 Pulsed laser deposition, a method of growing thin films
 Primary Linguistic Data, Chomsky's term for one's experiences of language during childhood.

Other uses
 Paul Laurence Dunbar High School (disambiguation), several schools
 Pierre-Luc Dubois, ice hockey player for the Winnipeg Jets
 The ISO 639 language code for Polari
 Product Liability Directive 1985, an EU directive that created a regime of strict liability for defective products
 The stock symbol for Prologis, a real estate investment trust
 Purushottam Laxman Deshpande, Marathi writer and humourist.
 Portslade railway station, a railway station in Sussex, England (station code: PLD)